This is the list of awards and nominations received by American actress Gabrielle Union.

Awards and nominations

Academy of Science Fiction, Fantasy & Horror Films

American Black Film Festival

Behind the Voice Actors Awards

BET Awards

BET Comedy Awards

Black Reel Awards

Gold Derby Awards

Independent Spirit Awards

NAACP Image Awards

NAMIC Vision Awards

Palm Beach International Film Festival

Teen Choice Awards

Young Hollywood Awards

References

External links 
 List of awards and nominations at IMDb

Union, Gabrielle